PB-9 Kohlu is a constituency of the Provincial Assembly of Balochistan.

General elections 2013

General elections 2008

See also
 PB-8 Sibi
 PB-10 Dera Bugti

References

External links
 Election commission Pakistan's official website
 Awazoday.com check result
 Balochistan's Assembly official site

Constituencies of Balochistan